Mohammadabad (also Romanized as Moḩammadābād and Muhammadābād) is a village in Koleyn Rural District, Fashapuyeh District, Ray County, Tehran Province, Iran. At the 2006 census, its population was 113, in 35 families.

References 

Populated places in Ray County, Iran